Elk Grove station is a proposed train station in Elk Grove, California. Located north of Laguna Boulevard near Dwight Road, it is under consideration as part of the Valley Rail Sacramento Extension Project between Stockton and Sacramento. It will be served by Amtrak California San Joaquins and Altamont Corridor Express trains. An earlier proposal for a North Elk Grove station was rejected after the Sacramento Regional Sanitation District (owners of the property) objected to its construction. The station is expected to open with the commencement of ACE service to Natomas in 2026.

At least three other railroad stations served Elk Grove in the past.

References

External links

Railway stations in Sacramento County, California
Future Amtrak stations in the United States
Future Altamont Corridor Express stations
Railway stations scheduled to open in 2026